Two general elections were held in Bangladesh in 1996:
Sixth parliamentary election on 15 February, which was won by BNP after Bangladesh Awami League, the other main party in Bangladesh, boycotted the elections.
Seventh parliamentary election on 12 June, which was won by Bangladesh Awami League after BNP was forced to dissolve the parliament and hold impartial elections under the caretaker government.

1996 elections in Bangladesh
1996
1996 elections in Asia
1996 in Bangladesh